
Sayt'u Qucha (Quechua sayt'u long and narrow, rectangular, qucha lake, "long and narrow lake",  hispanicized spellings Saythu Khocha, Saytu Khocha, Saytu Qhocha) is a Bolivian lake located in the Cochabamba Department, Tiraque Province, Tiraque Municipality, Tiraque Canton situated about 4,004 m high.

References 

Lakes of Cochabamba Department